Ria Money Transfer is a subsidiary of Euronet Worldwide, Inc., which specializes in money remittances. Ria initiates transfers through a network of agents and company-owned stores located throughout North America, Latin America, Europe, Asia-Pacific, Africa, and online.  Ria is one of the big four remittance companies.

History
The company opened its first store in 1987. Ria has since grown to become the third largest money transfer service in the world.

In 2006, Ria was acquired by Euronet Worldwide, Inc., becoming part of its money transfer segment together with XE.

Ria began working with post offices in 2010 and on July 31, 2014, partnered with Postbank, which is owned by the Kenyan Government. This allowed customers to send money through any of the bank's 99 branches, or receive it directly into their accounts.

In 2014, the company launched Walmart-2-Walmart Powered by Ria, a Walmart money transfer service within the US. The service allows customers to transfer money to and from more than 4,600 stores at competitive prices.

In 2015, Ria acquired Malaysia based money transfer provider IME.

In 2016, the company expanded its relationship with Walmart to Latin America and partnered with Walmart Chile to offer money transfer services through selected Líder brand supermarkets. In 2019, Ria and Walmart partnered with Paypal’s Xoom to introduce domestic money transfer services. Xoom expanded to 60 countries in the deal with Ria.

As of 2020, Ria’s money transfer services are available at over 470,000 locations in 159 countries, online, and through their app.

Ria continues to expand into Latin America with the support of a joint venture between parent company Euronet and Spain's Prosegur Cash.

The Central Bank of Nigeria listed Ria as one of their approved international money transfer operators for diaspora remittances in March 2021. First Bank of Nigeria also works with Ria to bring remittances into the country.

During the COVID-19 pandemic, the World Bank released a report detailing the importance of remittances to provide a critical lifeline for vulnerable populations.

Ria has international presence as a key company for sending remittances in Belarus and as one of the companies that pays the most for sending remittances from the US to Mexico.

Products and Services

Ria Money Transfer App 
The Ria Money Transfer App is available in the United States, Canada, and in most countries in Europe. With over 1,000,000 downloads, the app allows customers to send money through Ria’s global network.

Mobile Money 
Customers can send and receive money through Ria Money Transfer’s mobile wallet network. Sub-Saharan Africa is the region with the highest remittance costs, but it’s also the most developed when it comes to mobile wallets. In a partnership with Gambia's mobile money platform Qmoney, Ria customers can make fund transfers to Qmoney customers using their mobile phones.

References

External links
Ria Money Transfer Official Site
The Ria Blog

Financial services companies established in 1987
Online remittance providers
Financial services companies of the United States
Interbank networks
Foreign exchange companies